Etienne Oosthuizen may refer to:
 Etienne Oosthuizen (rugby union, born 1992), South African rugby union player
 Etienne Oosthuizen (rugby union, born 1994), South African rugby union player